The tunica vasculosa is the vascular layer of the testis, consisting of a plexus of blood vessels, held together by delicate areolar tissue.

It clothes the inner surface of the tunica albuginea and the different septa in the interior of the gland, and therefore forms an internal investment to all the spaces of which the gland is composed.

References

Mammal male reproductive system